Test cricket is the oldest form of cricket played at international level. A Test match is scheduled to take place over a period of five days, and is played by teams representing full member nations of the International Cricket Council (ICC).  
This is a list of South African Test cricket records. It is based on the List of Test cricket records, but concentrates solely on records dealing with the South African Test cricket team, and any cricketers who have played for them.

Key
The top five records are listed for each category, except for the team wins, losses, draws and ties and the partnership records. Tied records for fifth place are also included. Explanations of the general symbols and cricketing terms used in the list are given below. Specific details are provided in each category where appropriate. All records include matches played for India only, and are correct .

Team records

Overall Record

Team wins, losses, draws and ties 
, South Africa has played 459 Test matches resulting in 177 victories, 158 defeats and 124 draws for an overall winning percentage of 38.56.

First Test series wins

First Test match wins

Team scoring records

Most runs in an innings
The highest innings total scored in Test cricket came in the series between Sri Lanka and India in August 1997. Playing in the first Test at R. Premadasa Stadium in Colombo, the hosts posted a first innings total of 6/952d. This broke the longstanding record of 7/903d which England set against Australia in the final Test of the 1938 Ashes series at The Oval. The second Test of the 2003 series against the England saw South Africa set their highest innings total of 682/6d.

Highest successful run chases
South Africa's highest fourth innings total is 450/7 in an unsuccessful run chase against India at Johannesburg in December 2013. India had set a target of 457. South Africa's second highest fourth innings total of 423/7 came in another draw against England at The Oval in 1947. South Africa's highest successful run chase occurred against Australia at Perth in 2008, and is also the second highest successful fourth innings total. Australia had set South Africa a target of 414

Fewest runs in an innings
The lowest innings total scored in Test cricket came in the second Test of England's tour of New Zealand in March 1955. Trailing England by 46, New Zealand was bowled out in their second innings for 26 runs. The lowest score in Test history for South Africa is 30 scored twice against England in 1896 and 1924.

Most runs conceded in an innings
The highest innings total scored against South Africa is by Sri Lanka when they scored 756/5d in the first Test of the South Africa's tour of Sri Lanka in 2006 at Sinhalese Sports Club Ground.

Fewest runs conceded in an innings
The lowest innings total scored against South Africa is 45 in the first test of New Zealand's tour of South Africa in 2013

Result records
A Test match is won when one side has scored more runs than the total runs scored by the opposing side during their two innings. If both sides have completed both their allocated innings and the side that fielded last has the higher aggregate of runs, it is known as a win by runs. This indicates the number of runs that they had scored more than the opposing side. If one side scores more runs in a single innings than the total runs scored by the other side in both their innings, it is known as a win by innings and runs. If the side batting last wins the match, it is known as a win by wickets, indicating the number of wickets that were still to fall.

Greatest win margins (by innings)
The fifth Test of the 1938 Ashes series at The Oval saw England win by an innings and 579 runs, the largest victory by an innings in Test cricket history. The largest victory for South Africa, which is the 17th largest, is there win against Bangladesh in the first Test of the 2017 tour at the Mangaung Oval, where the hosts won by an innings and 254 runs.

Greatest win margins (by runs)
The greatest winning margin by runs in Test cricket was England's victory over Australia by 675 runs in the first Test of the 1928–29 Ashes series. The largest victory recorded by South Africa, which is the fourth largest victory, is the final Test of the 2018 series against Australia by 492 runs.

Greatest win margins (by 10 wickets)
South Africa have won a Test match by a margin of 10 wickets on 9 occasions.

Narrowest win margins (by runs)
South Africa's narrowest win by runs was against Australia in the second Test of the 1993-94 tour at Sydney Cricket Ground. Set 117 runs for victory in the final innings, Australia were bowled all out for 111 to give victory to South Africa by five runs. This was the sixth-narrowest win in Test cricket, with the narrowest being the West Indies' one-run win over Australia in 1993.

Narrowest win margins (by wickets)
South Africa's narrowest win by wickets came in the first Test of the English cricket team in South Africa in 1905-06 in January 1906. Played at the Old Wanderers Stadium, the hosts won the match by a margin of one wicket, one of only fourteen one-wicket victories in Test cricket.

Greatest loss margins (by innings)
The Oval in London played host the greatest defeat by an innings in Test cricket. The final Test of the 1938 Ashes saw England defeat the tourists by an innings and 579 runs, to the draw the series at one match all. South Africa's biggest defeat came at home during the Australian tour in 2002 when they lost by an innings and 360 runs at Wanderers Stadium, Johannesburg.

Greatest loss margins (by runs)
The first Test of the 1928–29 Ashes series saw Australia defeated by England by 675 runs, the greatest losing margin by runs in Test cricket. South Africa's biggest defeat by runs was against England in the fourth Test of the 1910-11 tour at Melbourne Cricket Ground.

Greatest loss margins (by 10 wickets)
South Africa have lost a Test match by a margin of 10 wickets on 12 occasions with most recent being during the 3rd test of the South Africa's tour of Australia in 2001-02.

Narrowest loss margins (by runs)
The narrowest loss of South Africa in terms of runs is by 23 runs against England in the fifth test of the South Africa's tour of England in 1998.

Narrowest loss margins (by wickets)
The narrowest loss of South Africa in terms of wickets is by 1 wicket, once against England and twice against Sri Lanka.

Individual records

Batting records

Most career runs
South Africa's Jacques Kallis has scored the third highest runs in Test cricket with 13,206. He is the only South African batsman to have scored more than 10,000 runs in Test cricket.

Most runs against each team

Fastest runs getter

Most runs in each batting position

Highest individual score
The first test of the South Africa's tour of England in 2012 saw Hashim Amla score the only triple century by a South African and record South Africa's highest Individual score.

Highest individual score – progression of record

Highest individual score against each team

Highest career average
A batsman's batting average is the total number of runs they have scored divided by the number of times they have been dismissed.

Highest Average in each batting position

Most half-centuries
A half-century is a score of between 50 and 99 runs. Statistically, once a batsman's score reaches 100, it is no longer considered a half-century but a century.

Sachin Tendulkar of India has scored the most half-centuries in Test cricket with 68. He is followed by the West Indies' Shivnarine Chanderpaul on 66, India's Rahul Dravid and Allan Border of Australia on 63 and in fifth with 62 fifties to his name, Australia's Ricky Ponting. Jacques Kallis is the highest rated South African with 58 fifties to his name.

Most centuries
A century is a score of 100 or more runs in a single innings.

Tendulkar has also scored the most centuries in Test cricket with 51. South Africa's Jacques Kallis is next on 45 and Ricky Ponting with 41 hundreds is in third.

Most double centuries
A double century is a score of 200 or more runs in a single innings.

Bradman holds the Test record for the most double centuries scored with twelve, one ahead of Sri Lanka's Kumar Sangakkara who finished his career with eleven. In third is Brian Lara of the West Indies with nine. England's Wally Hammond and Mahela Jayawardene of Sri Lanka both scored seven double centuries. Graeme Smith has scored the most double centuries for South Africa, with 5.

Most triple centuries
A triple century is a score of 300 or more runs in a single innings.

Hashim Amla is the only South African to have scored a triple century for South Africa.

Most Sixes

Most Fours

Most runs in a series
The 1930 Ashes series in England saw Don Bradman set the record for the most runs scored in a single series, falling just 26 short of 1,000 runs. He is followed by Wally Hammond with 905 runs scored in the 1928–29 Ashes series. Aubrey Faulkner with 732 in the 1910 tour of Australia is the highest South African on the list.

Most ducks
A duck refers to a batsman being dismissed without scoring a run. Morne Morkel has scored the equal sixteen-highest number of ducks in Test cricket. Glenn McGrath has scored the equal third-highest number of ducks in Test cricket behind Courtney Walsh with 43 and Chris Martin with 36.

Bowling records

Most career wickets
A bowler takes the wicket of a batsman when the form of dismissal is bowled, caught, leg before wicket, stumped or hit wicket. If the batsman is dismissed by run out, obstructing the field, handling the ball, hitting the ball twice or timed out the bowler does not receive credit.

South Africa's Dale Steyn is eight on the list, having taken 439 wickets.

Most career wickets against each team

Fastest wicket taker

Best figures in an innings
Bowling figures refers to the number of the wickets a bowler has taken and the number of runs conceded.
There have been two occasions in Test cricket where a bowler has taken all ten wickets in a single innings – Jim Laker of England took 10/53 against Australia in 1956 and India's Anil Kumble in 1999 returned figures of 10/74 against Pakistan. Hugh Tayfield and Keshav Maharaj are one of 15 bowlers who have taken nine wickets in a Test match innings.

Best figures in an innings against each team

Best figures in a match
A bowler's bowling figures in a match is the sum of the wickets taken and the runs conceded over both innings.

No bowler in the history of Test cricket has taken all 20 wickets in a match. The closest to do so was English spin bowler Jim Laker. During the fourth Test of the 1956 Ashes series, Laker took 9/37 in the first innings and 10/53 in the second to finish with match figures of 19/90. Makhaya Ntini, with figures of 13/132, taken during the second match of the South Africa tour of West Indies in 2005, is the best in Test cricket for South Africa.

Best career average
A bowler's bowling average is the total number of runs they have conceded divided by the number of wickets they have taken.
Nineteenth century English medium pacer George Lohmann holds the record for the best career average in Test cricket with 10.75. J. J. Ferris, one of fifteen cricketers to have played Test cricket for more than one team, is second behind Lohmann with an overall career average of 12.70 runs per wicket.

Best career economy rate
A bowler's economy rate is the total number of runs they have conceded divided by the number of overs they have bowled.
English bowler William Attewell, who played 10 matches for England between 1884 and 1892, holds the Test record for the best career economy rate with 1.31. South Africa's Trevor Goddard, with a rate of 1.64 runs per over conceded over his 41-match Test career, is third on the list.

Best career strike rate
A bowler's strike rate is the total number of balls they have bowled divided by the number of wickets they have taken.
As with the career average above, the top bowler with the best Test career strike rate is George Lohmann with strike rate of 34.1 balls per wicket. South Africa's Kagiso Rabada is at fourth position in this list.

Most five-wicket hauls in an innings
A five-wicket haul refers to a bowler taking five wickets in a single innings.
Dale Steyn is tenth on the list of most five-wicket hauls in Test cricket.

Most ten-wicket hauls in a match
A ten-wicket haul refers to a bowler taking ten or more wickets in a match over two innings.
As with the five-wicket hauls above, Anil Kumble is not only behind Muralitharan, Warne and Hadlee, he is also behind Rangana Herath of Sri Lanka in taking the most ten-wicket hauls in Test cricket.

Worst figures in an innings
The worst figures in a single innings in Test cricket came in the third Test between the West Indies at home to Pakistan in 1958. Pakistan's Khan Mohammad returned figures of 0/259 from his 54 overs in the second innings of the match. The worst figures by a South African is 0/221 that came off the bowling of Nicky Boje in the first test of the South Africa's tour of Sri Lanka in 2006.

Worst figures in a match
The worst figures in a match in Test cricket were taken by South Africa's Imran Tahir in the second Test against Australia at the Adelaide Oval in November 2012. He returned figures of 0/180 from his 23 overs in the first innings and 0/80 off 14 in the third innings for a total of 0/260 from 37 overs. He claimed the record in his final over when two runs came from it – enough for him to pass the previous record of 0/259, set 54 years prior.

Most wickets in a series
England's seventh Test tour of South Africa in 1913–14 saw the record set for the most wickets taken by a bowler in a Test series. English paceman Sydney Barnes played in four of the five matches and achieved a total of 49 wickets to his name. South Africa's Hugh Tayfield is joint 13th with his 37 wickets taken against England during the 1956–57 tour.

Hat-trick
In cricket, a hat-trick occurs when a bowler takes three wickets with consecutive deliveries. The deliveries may be interrupted by an over bowled by another bowler from the other end of the pitch or the other team's innings, but must be three consecutive deliveries by the individual bowler in the same match. Only wickets attributed to the bowler count towards a hat-trick; run outs do not count.
In Test cricket history there have been just 44 hat-tricks, the first achieved by Fred Spofforth for Australia against England in 1879. In 1912, Australian Jimmy Matthews achieved the feat twice in one game against South Africa. The only other players to achieve two hat-tricks are Australia's Hugh Trumble, against England in 1902 and 1904, Pakistan's Wasim Akram, in separate games against Sri Lanka in 1999, and England's Stuart Broad.

Wicket-keeping records
The wicket-keeper is a specialist fielder who stands behind the stumps being guarded by the batsman on strike and is the only member of the fielding side allowed to wear gloves and leg pads.

Most career dismissals
A wicket-keeper can be credited with the dismissal of a batsman in two ways, caught or stumped. A fair catch is taken when the ball is caught fully within the field of play without it bouncing after the ball has touched the striker's bat or glove holding the bat, while a stumping occurs when the wicket-keeper puts down the wicket while the batsman is out of his ground and not attempting a run.
South Africa's Mark Boucher holds the record for most dismissals in Test cricket as a designated wicket-keeper.

Most career catches
Boucher holds the record for most catches in Test cricket as a designated wicket-keeper.

Most career stumpings
Bert Oldfield, Australia's fifth-most capped wicket-keeper, holds the record for the most stumpings in Test cricket with 52. Boucher has most stumpings with 23.

Most dismissals in an innings
Four wicket-keepers have taken seven dismissals in a single innings in a Test match—Wasim Bari of Pakistan in 1979, Englishman Bob Taylor in 1980, New Zealand's Ian Smith in 1991 and most recently West Indian gloveman Ridley Jacobs against Australia in 2000.

The feat of taking 6 dismissals in an innings has been achieved by 24 wicket-keepers on 32 occasions including 4 South Africans.

Most dismissals in a match
Three wicket-keepers have made 11 dismissals in a Test match, Englishman Jack Russell in 1995, South African AB de Villiers in 2013 and most recently India's Rishabh Pant against Australia in 2018.

The feat of making 10 dismissals in a match has been achieved by 4 wicket-keepers on 4 occasions.

Most dismissals in a series
Brad Haddin holds the Test cricket record for the most dismissals taken by a wicket-keeper in a series. He took 29 catches during the 2013 Ashes series. South African record is held by John Waite and Mark Boucher with 26 dismissals.

Fielding records

Most career catches
Caught is one of the nine methods a batsman can be dismissed in cricket.  The majority of catches are caught in the slips, located behind the batsman, next to the wicket-keeper, on the off side of the field. Most slip fielders are top order batsmen.

India's Rahul Dravid holds the record for the most catches in Test cricket by a non-wicket-keeper with 209, followed by Mahela Jayawardene of Sri Lanka on 205 and South African Jacques Kallis with 196 for South Africa and 4 for ICC.

Most catches in a series
The 1920–21 Ashes series, in which Australia whitewashed England 5–0 for the first time, saw the record set for the most catches taken by a non-wicket-keeper in a Test series. Australian all-rounder Jack Gregory took 15 catches in the series as well as 23 wickets. South Africa's Bruce Mitchell, Trevor Goddard and Bert Vogler are equal tenth with 12 catches taken during a series.

All-round Records

1000 runs and 100 wickets
A total of 71 players have achieved the double of 1000 runs and 100 wickets in their Test career.

250 runs and 20 wickets in a series
A total of 18 players on 24 occasions have achieved the double of 250 runs and 20 wickets in a series.

Other records

Most career matches

India's Sachin Tendulkar holds the record for the most Test matches played with 200, with South Africa's Jacques Kallis being fourth having represented South Africa on 165 occasions.

Most consecutive career matches
Former English captain Alastair Cook holds the record for the most consecutive Test matches played with 159. He broke Allan Border's long standing record of 153 matches in June 2018. AB de Villiers, the South African played 98 consecutive Test matches, is sixth.

Most matches as captain

Graeme Smith, who led the South African cricket team from 2003 to 2014, holds the record for the most matches played as captain in Test cricket with 109.

Youngest players
The youngest player to play in a Test match is claimed to be Hasan Raza at the age of 14 years and 227 days. Making his debut for Pakistan against Zimbabwe on 24 October 1996, there is some doubt as to the validity of Raza's age at the time. The youngest cricketer to play Test cricket for South Africa was Paul Adams who at the age of 18 years and 340 days debuted in the fourth Test of the series against England in December 1995 at St George's Park.

Oldest players on Debut
England left-arm slow bowler James Southerton is the oldest player to appear in a Test match. Playing in the very first inaugural test against Australia in 1876 at Melbourne Cricket Ground, in Melbourne, Australia, he was aged 49 years and 119 days. Omar Henry is the oldest South African Test debutant in the 1992–93 series against India at Kingsmead Cricket Ground.

Oldest players
England all-rounder Wilfred Rhodes is the oldest player to appear in a Test match. Playing in the fourth Test against the West Indies in 1930 at Sabina Park, in Kingston, Jamaica, he was aged 52 years and 165 days on the final day's play. The oldest South African Test player is Dave Nourse who was aged 45 years and 204 days when he represented South Africa for the final time in the 1924 tour of England at The Oval.

Partnership records
In cricket, two batsmen are always present at the crease batting together in a partnership. This partnership will continue until one of them is dismissed, retires or the innings comes to a close.

Highest partnerships by wicket
A wicket partnership describes the number of runs scored before each wicket falls. The first wicket partnership is between the opening batsmen and continues until the first wicket falls. The second wicket partnership then commences between the not out batsman and the number three batsman. This partnership continues until the second wicket falls. The third wicket partnership then commences between the not out batsman and the new batsman. This continues down to the tenth wicket partnership. When the tenth wicket has fallen, there is no batsman left to partner so the innings is closed.

Highest partnerships by runs
The highest Test partnership by runs for any wicket is held by the Sri Lankan pairing of Kumar Sangakkara and Mahela Jayawardene who put together a third wicket partnership of 624 runs during the first Test against South Africa in July 2006. This broke the record of 576 runs set by their compatriots Sanath Jayasuriya and Roshan Mahanama against India in 1997. South Africa's Jacques Rudolph and Boeta Dippenaar hold the 10th highest Test partnership with 429 made in 2003 against Bangladesh.

Highest overall partnership runs by a pair

Umpiring records

Most matches umpired
An umpire in cricket is a person who officiates the match according to the Laws of Cricket. Two umpires adjudicate the match on the field, whilst a third umpire has access to video replays, and a fourth umpire looks after the match balls and other duties. The records below are only for on-field umpires.

Aleem Dar of Pakistan holds the record for the most Test matches umpired with 130. The current active Dar set the record in December 2019 overtaking Steve Bucknor from the West Indies mark of 128 matches. They are followed by South Africa's Rudi Koertzen who officiated in 108.

Notes

References 

Test cricket records
Test cricket records